Poongothai Aladi Aruna is an Indian politician and former Information and Technology minister of Tamil Nadu under DMK ruling in 2006–2011.  In 2016 Tamil Nadu assembly election she contested from Alangulam (State Assembly Constituency) and won the election with 88891 votes.

Personal life 
She is the daughter of the late DMK minister Aladi Aruna. She was born in Chennai on 28 October 1964. She is a gynaecologist by profession and received part of her education in London. She married Balaji Venugopal in the late 1980s. They have two daughters, Samantha and Kavya.

Electoral performance 
She was given a ticket to contest elections after her father's death. She was elected to the Tamil Nadu legislative assembly as a Dravida Munnetra Kazhagam candidate from Alangulam constituency in  2006 elections. She later went on to become Social Welfare minister in the then Tamil Nadu government.

Social Welfare Minister 
During her tenure as the Social Welfare Minister, Chief Minister Kalaignar M Karunanidhi announced the Two Egg scheme in the midday meals and now it is three times a day. The physically challenged people were given high priority during this period to the extent of a complete survey, National ID Card, Government benefits and motorised vehicles. She had submitted her resignation on 14 May 2008 following a controversy over her telephone conversation with the Director of Vigilance and Anti-Corruption S.K. Upadhyay about a corruption case involving her relative.

IT Minister 
On 28 February 2009 Poongathai Aladi Aruna was reinstated as Minister for Information Technology to the Government of Tamil Nadu. This is first time that Tamil Nadu Govt. has a separate minister for Information Technology.

Scandal 
In an audio CD released by Janata party president Subramanian Swamy on 13 May 2008, Poongothai is pleading with the Director of Vigilance and Anti-corruption, SK Upadhyay to be soft on her relative, Jawahar. Jawahar is an electrical engineer in the Tamil Nadu electricity board and was caught accepting bribes. She later confirmed that the voice in that tape is really hers and resigned from office accepting responsibility.

Nira Radia Tapes 
She has been involved in Nira Radia tapes published by Outlook magazine. The conversation has Niira Radia explaining to Poongothai Aladi Aruna, why Kanimozhi has made a mistake by refusing the MoS portfolio and how she now must remain friends with Azhagiri. "She should have taken the MoS, but she had her own views. Kani must learn to look after herself. This is politics and it is very cut throat, nobody is your friend, nobody is your enemy. I don’t know whether she feels that she's made a mistake and recognises it. Please, you must talk to her and tell her to be friend with Azhagiri. Trust me, it’s very important for them to remains friends."

References 

Dravida Munnetra Kazhagam politicians
Tamil Nadu ministers
Living people
21st-century Indian women politicians
21st-century Indian politicians
Politicians from Chennai
1964 births
Tamil Nadu MLAs 2006–2011
Tamil Nadu MLAs 2016–2021
Tamil Nadu politicians
Women members of the Tamil Nadu Legislative Assembly